The Dictionary of American Naval Fighting Ships (DANFS) is the official reference work for the basic facts about ships used by the United States Navy.

When the writing project was developed the parameters for this series were designed to cover only commissioned US Navy ships with assigned names. If the ship was not assigned a name it was not included in the histories written for the series.
In addition to the ship entries, DANFS and the online links have been expanded to include appendices on small craft, histories of Confederate Navy ships, and various essays related to naval ships.

Forewords and introductions
Foreword and introduction passages for many editions were written by big names from naval command history from Arleigh Albert Burke to Elmo Russell Zumwalt, Jr. and others.

Authors

Publication data

DANFS was published in print by the Naval Historical Center (NHC) as bound hardcover volumes, ordered by ship name, from Volume I (A–B) in 1959 to Volume VIII (W–Z) in 1981. Several volumes subsequently went out of print. In 1991 a revised Volume I Part A, covering only ship names beginning with A, was released. Work continues on revisions of the remaining volumes.

Volunteers at the Hazegray website undertook to transcribe the DANFS and make it available on the World Wide Web. The project goal is a direct transcription of the DANFS, with
changes limited to correcting typographical errors and editorial notes for incorrect facts in the original.
In 2008 the NHC was re-designated as the Naval History and Heritage Command (NHHC). It has developed an online version of DANFS (see External links section below) through a combination of optical character recognition (OCR) and hand transcription. The NHHC is slowly updating its online DANFS to correct errors and take into account the gap in time between the print publication and the present date. NHHC prioritizes updates as follows: ships currently commissioned, ships commissioned after the original volume publication, ships decommissioned after original volume publication, and finally updates to older ships. The NHHC has begun a related project to place Ship History and Command Operations Reports online at their DANFS site.

Reference use

As the DANFS is a work of the U.S. government, its content is in the public domain, and the text is often quoted verbatim in other works. Many websites organized by former and active crew members of U.S. Navy vessels include a copy of their ships' DANFS entries.

The Dictionary limits itself largely to basic descriptions and brief operational notes, and includes almost no analysis or historical context.

See also
List of sloops of war of the United States Navy
List of sailing frigates of the United States Navy
Bibliography of early American naval history

References

External links
Naval History and Heritage Command - Dictionary of American Naval Fighting Ships

1959 non-fiction books
Encyclopedias of the military
 Dictionary
United States Navy publications
Naval History and Heritage Command